In New York State, to qualify for automatic ballot access, a party must qualify every two years by receiving the greater of 130,000 votes or 2% of the vote in the previous gubernatorial election or presidential election. In years with a gubernatorial election or presidential election a party must run a gubernatorial candidate (as well as a lieutenant governor candidate, although the state will accept petitions without a lieutenant governor candidate if no other candidate challenges them) or a presidential candidate to be eligible for automatic ballot access; if 130,000 voters vote for that candidate on their party line, they have qualified the party for the next two years until the following presidential or gubernatorial general election whichever one comes first. A party that is not qualified may run candidates by completing a petition process. Parties are also allowed to cross-endorse candidates, whose votes are accumulated under electoral fusion, but any parties must cross-endorse both the governor and lieutenant governor candidates for fusion to apply. Parties that are already qualified must issue a Wilson Pakula authorization if they cross-endorse someone not enrolled in that party; there are no restrictions (other than that the candidate must be eligible for office) on who can be nominated on a non-qualified ballot line, as these lines are determined by filing petitions.

For statewide and special elections, automatic ballot access means that no petitions have to be filed to gain access to a ballot line, and party organizations can endorse candidates through their own conventions (this does not apply to legislative candidates, who still must petition onto the ballot regardless of party endorsement, but are only required to collect a third of the signatures required of non-qualified parties). Qualified parties also are the only parties eligible to hold primary elections in the state-run primary elections. In addition to determining whether they automatically qualify for the next four years, this also determines the order on the ballot; qualified parties are ranked in order of gubernatorial votes, with the party having the most votes atop the ballot.

The threshold for automatic ballot access was originally 50,000 votes every four years during the gubernatorial election. The current threshold was adopted in 2020 prior to the 2020 presidential election. The adoption of the current threshold has led to legal challenges from parties that qualified for automatic ballot access under the previous threshold but not the current one.

Parties that do not qualify automatically can petition their way onto the ballot. For statewide candidates, this requires 45,000 signatures, and requires 500 signatures in at least half of the congressional districts in the state. The Socialist Workers Party regularly used this approach to appear on the ballot before abandoning its ballot-access efforts in 2010, then stopped running statewide candidates entirely in 2018. These parties also are not eligible to run primaries, and the first person to submit 15,000 signatures automatically gets the party line. (Sam Sloan attempted to use this tactic to take the 2010 and 2014 Libertarian gubernatorial nominations from that party's nominee, this before the Libertarians gained ballot access in 2018, but failed for lack of signatures.)

1994

In the 1994 election, the Democratic Party received the most votes, and so qualified to be first on the ballot for the next four years, even though their candidate, incumbent Governor Mario Cuomo, lost. George Pataki beat him because he received more votes combined over all of his party lines.

1998

In the 1998 election, the new Working Families Party and Green Party gained automatic ballot access while the Tax Cut Now Party, who did not run a candidate in the election failed to re-qualify.

2002

In the 2002 election, three qualified parties failed to re-qualify: the Liberal Party, Right to Life Party, and the Green Party. The Liberals became dormant, the Right to Life dramatically scaled back its operations, while the Greens continued mostly unaffected before re-qualifying in 2010.

2006

The same five parties who qualified in 2002 re-qualified in the 2006 election.

2010

After the 2010 elections, these parties with ballot access were joined by a sixth party, the Green Party.

2014

Two additional parties qualified in the 2014 elections: the Women's Equality Party (a front for incumbent Governor Andrew Cuomo) and the Stop Common Core Party (a line created by Republican candidate Rob Astorino). The Stop Common Core Party rechristened itself the Reform Party, initially unrelated to the national Reform Party, on February 17, 2015. In an effort to quash a trademark infringement dispute from the national Reform Party, the state party allowed national Reform Party officers, including chairman Bill Merrill, to take over the party. In September 2016, Curtis Sliwa orchestrated a hostile takeover of the Reform Party, and it is no longer related to the national party.

2018

For the first time in the 48-year history of the Libertarian Party of New York, the party qualified for automatic ballot access with Larry Sharpe's 90,816 votes. In addition, former Syracuse mayor Stephanie Miner achieved automatic ballot access for the newly created Serve America Movement line. The Women's Equality Party and the Reform Party failed to re-qualify. Shortly after the Libertarian Party (United States) and Serve America Movement qualified for ballot access, the New York State Board of Elections raised the threshold for automatic ballot access from 50,000 votes to 2% or about 130,000 votes. As a result, both parties had their automatic ballot access rescinded. The Libertarian Party sued for ballot access, as did the Serve America Movement. The Serve America Movement lawsuit was against Todd D. Valentine and Robert A. Brehm, the Co-Execute Directors of the New York State Board of Elections, and Peter S. Kosinski, Douglas A. Kellner, and Andrew J. Spano, the Commissioners of the New York State Board of Elections. District Judge John G. Koeltl denied the request. The Libertarian Party of New York and the Green Party of New York filed a joint lawsuit against the New York Board of Elections, its chairs, commissioners, and executive directors. District Judge John G. Koeltl denied the request. Consequently, the Libertarian Party, Serve America Movement, Green Party, and Independence Party of New York have had their ballot access removal upheld. Larry Sharpe (politician) has indicated that he may "sue personally" for ballot access during the announcement of an exploratory committee to run for Governor of New York again in 2022.

2020

The 2020 presidential race was the first presidential race to count for automatic ballot access in addition to the gubernatorial race. It was also the first election under the new qualification threshold where candidates were required to receive the greater of 130,000 votes or 2% of the vote to maintain automatic ballot access. The Libertarian Party of New York, the Green Party of New York, and the Independence Party of New York did not receive enough votes to re-qualify.
The Serve America Movement was unable to re-qualify since it did not run a candidate.

2022

This is the first New York gubernatorial election in over 80 years not featuring any third-party candidates after the New York State Board of Elections rejected the petitions of all the minor parties that put forward candidates.

References

New York (state) elections